Frank Esteban Moreno García (born November 17, 1965 in Matanzas) is a retired Cuban judoka, who represented his native country twice at the Summer Olympics. He won several medals during his career at the Pan American Games in the Men's Heavyweight (+ 95 kg) division.

References

1965 births
Living people
Judoka at the 1992 Summer Olympics
Judoka at the 1996 Summer Olympics
Judoka at the 1991 Pan American Games
Judoka at the 1995 Pan American Games
Olympic judoka of Cuba
Sportspeople from Matanzas
Cuban male judoka
Pan American Games gold medalists for Cuba
Pan American Games silver medalists for Cuba
Pan American Games medalists in judo
Goodwill Games medalists in judo
Competitors at the 1990 Goodwill Games
Medalists at the 1987 Pan American Games
Medalists at the 1991 Pan American Games
Medalists at the 1995 Pan American Games
20th-century Cuban people
21st-century Cuban people